Sourav Pal (born 1955) is an Indian theoretical chemist, a professor of chemistry at IIT Bombay, and the director of the Indian Institute of Science Education and Research, Kolkata. He was a director of CSIR-National Chemical Laboratory in Pune, and an adjunct professor at the Indian Institute of Science Education and Research, Pune.

He has some contributions in the field of coupled cluster based methods of Quantum Chemistry. His major scientific accomplishments include rigorous development of expectation value as well as extended coupled-cluster functional and development of the response properties to multi-reference coupled cluster (MRCC) theory.  He has developed a non-iterative approximation to coupled-perturbed Kohn-Sham density functional theoretic equations to calculate non-linear properties, which is implemented in the developers' version of deMon code.

He has also made contributions in the area of reactivity descriptors, highlighting the conditions of validity of the principle of maximum hardness, deriving the qualitative relation of hardness with polarizability, establishing Hirshfeld population in the calculation of condensed Fukui functions, and developing the local hard-soft-acid-base principle for molecular recognition. Further, among his major scientific contributions is the study of anti-aromaticity in metal clusters using ab initio molecular dynamics (AIMD), study of structure, electron localization function, and magnetic ring currents. He has addressed the theoretical incorporation of Sn-into Beta Zeolites theoretically using AIMD and is actively engaged in the computational study of the hydrogen storage properties of materials.

Academic background 
He obtained his master's degree from the Indian Institute of Technology (Kanpur) in 1977 and his doctorate from the University of Calcutta, working at the Indian Association for the Cultivation of Science (IACS), supervised by Debashis Mukherjee. He was subsequently a post-doctoral researcher at the University of Florida with Rodney J. Bartlett in 1986.

Awards and honor's 

Sourav Pal is a recipient of various awards and honors.

 Recipient of the first SASTRA-CNR Rao Award for excellence in chemistry and material science in 2014.
  Recipient of the Shanti Swarup Bhatnagar Prize in Chemical Sciences, 2000.
  Recipient of JC Bose National Fellowship of DST, 2008.
  Recipient of Chemical Research Society of India Silver Medal, 2009.
  Elected as a Fellow of the Indian National Science Academy, New Delhi, 2003.
  Elected as a Fellow of the National Academy of Sciences, India, Allahabad, 1998.
  Elected as a Fellow of the Indian Academy of Sciences, Bangalore, 1996.
  Received Dr. Jagdish Shankar Memorial Lecture of the Indian National Science Academy, 2006.
  Recipient of Bimla Churn Law memorial Lecture Award of IACS, Kolkata, 2005.
  Dai-Ichi Karkaria Endowment Fellow of UICT, 2004–05.
  Recipient of the Chemical Research Society of India medal, 2000.
  Elected as a Fellow of the Maharashtra Academy of Sciences, 1994.
  Recipient of the NCL Research Foundation Scientist of the year (1999) award.
  Recipient of the P.B.Gupta Memorial lecture Award of the Indian Association for the Cultivation of Science, Calcutta for 1993.
  Received Council of Scientific and Industrial Research (CSIR) Young Scientist award in Chemical Sciences for 1989.
  Received Indian National Science Academy (INSA) medal for Young Scientist 1987.
  Received NCL Research Foundation Best Paper Award in Physical Sciences for the year 1995, 1996, 1997, 1999, 2000, 2002.
  Delivered Prof. R. P. Mitra Memorial Lecture, Delhi University, 2010.

Membership of Editorial Boards of Journals / Societies 
  Chosen as a member of the Editorial Board of International Journal of Molecular Sciences from 2000.
  Member Advisory Editorial Board, Current Physical Chemistry, Bentham Science from 2010.
  Member, Editorial Board, Journal of Chemical Sciences, published by the Indian Academy of Sciences, Bangalore from 2004.
  Member, Editorial Board, Proc. Indian National Science Academy, from 1 January 2006.
  Member, Editorial Board, International Journal of Applied Chemistry, from 2005.
  Elected as a Life Member of the Society for Scientific Values.
Member, American Physical Society, USA

Research highlights 
He has made contributions to the field of theoretical chemical physics and has contributed to the methodological and conceptual development of chemical problems, focusing on their application. Following are the specific areas and details of his work.

Frontier theoretical development on molecular electric properties 
Highly accurate theories have been developed by taking into account the complex, correlated motion of electrons in molecules for the description of non-linear electric properties. Theories using many-body coupled-cluster methods are based on the evaluation of derivatives of energy with respect to external fields in an analytic manner. He carried out extensive development of these theories for molecules with closed shell configurations. The codes developed by him have a potential use in the description of non-linear molecular materials, with possible applications in electronic devices.

At the next stage, the more demanding cases of open shell systems, which are marked by a high degree of quasi-degeneracy, were addressed by him
. This creates physical problems that are theoretically difficult to address. Using a multi-determinant description of reference space, which can adequately address this quasi-degeneracy, a coupled-cluster analytic derivative was formulated to compute accurate non-linear properties. This general-purpose analytic derivative formulation is the first one based on the multi-reference coupled-cluster method and is a significant development in quantum chemistry. He has implemented the theory to study the properties of radicals and excited states.

Theoretical investigation of hard-soft acid-base relation 
His early contributions involved an extensive ab initio verification of the principle of maximum hardness. He has studied various properties of hardness and softness in relation to molecular properties, like polarizability.  Seminal contributions were made by him in developing new local descriptors for intra- and intermolecular reactivities. Using the local hard-soft-acid-base principle, he has calculated interaction energies with the help of only local descriptors of the interacting systems. He has recently identified "Bond Deformation Kernel" (BDK) correlating with interaction-induced shifts in O–H frequencies in halide-water clusters. Central to his model is the use of local polarization, which can be described by Normalized-Atom-Condensed Fukui Functions (NFF), which is the normal condensed Fukui Function multiplied by the number of atoms. Using the NFF and charge transferred to water from a halide ion, a BDK has been defined, which appropriately describes the shift in OH frequency.

Study of electron-molecule scattering
Sourav has also made an important study in identifying the exchange effects as dominant contributions to the correlated static exchange (CSE) potential of the molecule in electron-molecule scattering. The properties of CSE were studied extensively in relation to their use in the scattering of electrons by molecules. Recently, his group used the complex-scaling method within the coupled-cluster method to describe the electron-atom resonance. A complex absorbing potential and an approximation to this based on the multi-reference coupled-cluster method to calculate the resonance of molecular anions have also been developed by his group. The procedure is based on the analytical continuation method. The advantage of the analytical continuation of the Hamiltonian in the complex plane, which gives direct access to the resonance parameters, is that they can be represented by using the L2 wave function. The essential idea underlying the complex absorbing potentials used to calculate the resonances is to introduce an absorbing boundary condition in the exterior region of the molecularly scattered target that results in a non-Hermitian Hamiltonian, one of the square-integrable eigenfunctions of which corresponds to the resonant state. The associated complex eigen-value then gives the position and width of the resonance, or the auto-ionizing state. The important relaxation and correlation effects are included in the coupled-cluster method.

Density functional response approach for molecular properties
A computationally viable alternative to the full analytic response to Kohn-Sham density functional theoretic (DFT) approach, which solves coupled-perturbed Kohn-Sham (CPKS) procedure in a non-iteratively has been formulated by Sourav. In the above procedure, the derivative of the KS matrix is obtained using the finite field, and then the density matrix derivative is obtained by a single-step CPKS solution followed by the analytic evaluation of properties.  He has implemented this in deMON2K software and used it for the calculation of electric properties.

Development and application of molecular dynamics
He developed ab initio molecular dynamics using Gaussian basis sets and Born-
Oppenheimer approximation to study reactions of finite-sized molecules.  His study on the structure and electron localization function of mixed metal clusters has led to novel evidence of anti-aromaticity in metal clusters.
Sn-beta zeolite has attracted recent interest due to its better catalytic behavior compared to Ti-Beta zeolite. Al-free Sn-beta zeolite has been recently synthesized, and it has been shown by another group to have efficient catalytic activity in Beyer-Villeger oxidation reactions in the presence of H2O2.  The structure, bonding, and acidity of Sn-beta zeolite has been studied using periodic DFT and it has been demonstrated that incorporation of Sn in BEA framework reduces the cohesive energy and is an endothermic process.  A computational study of hydrogen storage materials, like magnesium hydrides using Born Oppenheimer molecular dynamics has been made. In particular, studies of hydrogen desorption and the effects of dopants, Al and Si has been made.

References

External links
 

Living people
20th-century Indian chemists
Recipients of the Shanti Swarup Bhatnagar Award in Chemical Science
Indian computational chemists
Year of birth missing (living people)
Scientists from West Bengal